Emu is a British television puppet, modelled on the Australian flightless emu bird and operated by the performer Rod Hull. After appearing on a number of variety shows, he was given his own television series on the BBC, then on ITV.

Cast

The Pink Windmill Kids 
In the first series, The Pink Windmill Kids were all students of Pattison College, which at the time was known as The Betty Pattison Dancing Academy. Subsequently they came from the Corona Theatre School, known at the time as the Corona Stage School. 

Abbie Shilling appeared in the most episodes of all the Pink Windmill Kids, closely followed by Kelly Rossiter.

BBC

Emu's Broadcasting Company 
Emu's Broadcasting Company (1975–1980) is a children's television series featuring Rod Hull and Emu running their own television station, which parodied many BBC series of the time. Supporting Rod Hull and his emu puppet were Billy Dainty who played a James Bond pastiche called Captain Perceval and Barbara New who played the tea lady.

Transmissions 
Series 1: 6 editions from 18 November 1975 – 23 December 1975
Series 2: 6 editions from 12 November 1976 – 17 December 1976
Series 3: 6 editions from 10 October 1977 – 14 November 1977
Series 4: 8 editions from 26 October 1978 – 14 December 1978
Series 5: 8 editions from 2 December 1979 – 27 January 1980
Christmas Special: 24 December 1977

BBC Specials 
Rod and Emu became staples of early-evening variety entertainment on or around Bank Holidays, and the following one-off specials were made for the BBC:

Emu's Blackpool Walkabout: 29 August 1977 (30 Minutes)
Emu's Cornish Walkabout: 28 August 1978 (30 Minutes)
Emu's Scottish Walkabout: 27 August 1979 (35 Minutes)
Emu's Magical Music Show: 27 December 1980 (35 Minutes)
Emu's Magical Christmas Show: 27 December 1981 (35 Minutes)
Emu's Magical Easter Show: 12 April 1982 (35 Minutes)

Rod and Emu's Saturday Specials (BBC) 
Series 1: 6 editions from 1 January 1983 – 5 February 1983

The Rod & Emu Show (BBC) 
Series 1: 6 editions from 28 January 1984 – 10 March 1984

ITV

Emu's World 
In 1981, Rod Hull was offered the opportunity to make a series for younger children by the newly-awarded ITV franchise Central Independent Television. This led to the birth of the Pink Windmill in which Rod and Emu lived, the green witch named Grotbags (played by the singer and comedienne Carol Lee Scott), and her hopeless assistant Croc. The premise of the show was simple: each week Grotbags attempted to steal Emu so that, once captured, (in Grotbags's own words) she would be able to use its "special powers" to control all the "brats" in the world. Children from the Corona Theatre School—referred to collectively as the Pink Windmill Kids—were on hand to offer protection and break into one or two song and dance routines per episode.

The show featured Rod Hull's chanted catchphrase "There's somebody at the door, oh, there's somebody at the door" every time a visitor rang the doorbell of the Pink Windmill—which 'sneezed' loudly when pressed.

Transmission 
Series 1: 6 editions from 5 January 1982 – 9 February 1982
Series 2: 6 editions from 27 October 1982 – 1 December 1982
Series 3: 6 editions from 2 March 1983 – 6 April 1983
Series 4: 6 editions from 7 September 1983 – 12 October 1983
Special: Emu's World at Christmas – 21 December 1983
Series 5: 6 editions from 9 March 1984 – 13 April 1984
Special: Emu at Easter: 20 April 1984

Emu's All Live Pink Windmill Show 
The success of Emu's World led to the series being expanded in mid-1984 from 20-minute to 42-minute episodes and re-branded as the Pink Windmill Show. The target age range was broadened, and the programme now featured viewer phone calls, a studio audience, games such as one in Grotbags's grotto based on the format of the "take the money or open the box" segment of Take Your Pick!, the Post Office (for viewers to send their letters and pictures), and Boggle's Kingdom—a mini-series featuring Rod's ancestor who is trapped in Tudor times. A subsequent addition was the Twin Schools section, which aimed to pair British schools with similar ones in Australia, Canada, or the US.

The singing and dancing of the Pink Windmill Kids was retained, extra character Robot Redford introduced, and the show in this format achieved enormous popularity (evidenced by being broadcast in the coveted Children's ITV slot of last thing on a Friday). Three series were broadcast live from 1984 to 1986 (despite the third run dropping "All Live" from the title), and in 1987 two series of Emu's Wide World were made. These followed a similar formula to the Pink Windmill Shows, but were pre-recorded, resulting in the phone-based Spin Quiz being replaced by Emu's Bargain Basement—an obstacle course in a supermarket. A final series of Emu's World aired in 1988, which retained Boggle's Kingdom and introduced an outdoors obstacle course despite being cut to a 20-minute run time. All series were produced and directed by Colin Clews for Central Independent Television and broadcast from the now-defunct East Midlands Television Centre in Nottingham.

A clip from the first live episode (13 July 1984), in which the Pink Windmill Kids enthusiastically introduce themselves before launching into a rendition of the Village People song "Can't Stop the Music", became an Internet meme in late 2016, and in early 2017 the kids in the sequence (with the exception of Spencer, who was unavailable) reunited to remake the segment in aid of Comic Relief.

Transmission 
Emu's All Live Pink Windmill Show
Series 1: 7 editions from 13 July 1984 – 24 August 1984
Emu at Christmas – 25 December 1984
Series 2: 13 editions from 12 April 1985 – 5 July 1985

Emu's Pink Windmill Show
Series 1: 10 editions from 14 February 1986 – 25 April 1986
Emu at Easter – 29 March 1986 (repeat of 1984 special)
Emu at Christmas – 26 December 1986 (repeat of 1984 special)

Emu's Wide World
Series 1: 9 editions from 3 April 1987 – 5 June 1987
Series 2: 8 editions from 3 November 1987 – 5 January 1988

Emu's World
Series 6: 13 editions from 12 May 1988 – 4 August 1988

EMU-TV 
Following the demise of Emu's World, Rod Hull went to Canada and recorded a single series of EMU-TV, based heavily on his earlier Emu's Broadcasting Company series. His co-stars this time were Murray Langston and Carolyn Scott, while Les Foubracs made regular guest appearances. These episodes were brought back to the UK and re-edited for a British audience by Central Independent Television, with a small number of additional segments featuring Grotbags and the Pink Windmill Kids also being shot.

Episode 5 of this series features future England international footballer Emile Heskey running an obstacle course and accidentally being called "Emily".

Transmission 
 Series 1: 22 editions from 15 March 1989 – 20 September 1989

Rod 'n' Emu

Emu 

The first episode of Emu's new series, simply called Emu, was broadcast on 8 October 2007. The first series was filmed in Belfast with shots at Queens Street Flats. The main characters are Emu and his owner, Toby (Toby Hull), a computer games designer. Toby has to keep Emu a secret from Ken Cole, a grumpy security guard. Toby's neighbours, children Charlie and Dani, help him to keep Emu a secret. Toby's other neighbour, Sophie, is the villainess of the show: an air hostess who becomes obsessed with making money off of Emu, but her plans always backfire on her. At the end of the first series, Emu and Toby moved back to Australia.

In June 2009, it was announced that a second series of the show with 26 episodes was produced by the Gibson Group a New Zealand film and broadcast company. Most of the cast was done by New Zealand actors. The plot in the second series is where Toby has a job in a kids' cafe. He meets Kelly (Bryony Skillington), the cafe manager, who is allergic to birds, especially Emu, although she still adores Emu. Cafe kids Sam and Georgia live upstairs above the cafe. They are good friends with Emu. They all must watch out for Leo Leach (Toby Leach), the town inspector who is strict with pest control; he will close the cafe down if an animal is found.

The first episode of the second series was broadcast on 13 September 2009 on ITV1 at 9:45am. The second-series puppeteer was Nick Blake and the director was Danny Mulheron the same director of Paradise Café by the same company. The second episode was broadcast on the same day as well.

It was shown on CITV with repeats until April 2014.

References

External links 
 Emu's Broadcasting Company (Ebc1) (TV series)
 Emu's World (TV series)

1975 British television series debuts
1989 British television series endings
1970s British children's television series
1980s British children's television series
BBC children's television shows
ITV children's television shows
British television shows featuring puppetry
BBC television comedy
ITV comedy
Television series by ITV Studios
English-language television shows
Television shows produced by Central Independent Television
Television articles with incorrect naming style